Kalo Chandramani (born 28 March 1916) is an Indian politician. He was elected to the Lok Sabha, the lower house of the Parliament of India from Sundargarh, Odisha as a member of the Ganatantra Parishad.

References

External links
Official Biographical Sketch in Lok Sabha Website

1916 births
Possibly living people
India MPs 1957–1962
Indian politicians
Lok Sabha members from Odisha